Stefano Lanini (born 4 September 1994) is an Italian football player. He plays for U.S.D. Olginatese.

Club career
He made his Serie B debut for Virtus Entella on 14 February 2015 in a game against Trapani.

On 29 August 2019, he joined Serie D club NibionnOggiono. In December 2019, he then joined U.S.D. Olginatese.

References

External links
 

1994 births
Footballers from Milan
Living people
Italian footballers
Association football defenders
Italy youth international footballers
Virtus Entella players
U.S. Pistoiese 1921 players
Alma Juventus Fano 1906 players
A.S. Giana Erminio players
U.S.D. Olginatese players
Serie B players
Serie C players
Serie D players
S.C. Caronnese S.S.D. players
A.C.D. Sant'Angelo 1907 players